Pierick Houdy (18 January 1929 – 22 March 2021) was a French composer, organist, pianist, kapellmeister, and professor.

Biography
Houdy began his musical studies in 1935 at the Conservatoire de Rennes. His first compositions date from that year. In 1937, he first played publicly at the Opéra de Rennes and his first four works were published by Henry Lemoine under the title À mes petits amis. He practiced piano with Marguerite Long and was admitted to the Conservatoire de Paris in 1939, where he studied under Noël Gallon, Nadia Boulanger, Simone Plé-Caussade, Maurice Duruflé, Olivier Messiaen, Darius Milhaud, and others. Outside the Conservatory, he studied piano with Lazare Lévy. He received the Deuxième Prix of the Prix de Rome in 1953 and won first prize in composition from the Conservatoire de Paris in 1954, as well at the Grand Prix de la Ville de Paris that same year.

He was then a professor of composition at the Université Laval and the Conservatoire de musique et d'art dramatique du Québec. He returned to France in 1992 and began teaching musical writing in Brest and Quimper.

Pierick Houdy died in Le Palais on 22 March 2021 at the age of 92.

Filmography (selection) 
 1964: License to Kill (Nick Carter va tout casser)
 1965: Ces dames s'en mêlent
 1978: The Backstreet Six (Comme les six doigts de la main)
 1986: Bach and Broccoli (Bach et Bottine) 
 1990: Vincent and Me

References

External links 

1929 births
2021 deaths
Musicians from Rennes
French composers
French organists
French film score composers